Jessica Melbourne-Thomas is a marine, Antarctic and climate change scientist with the Commonwealth Scientific and Industrial Research Organisation, Australia. Her research focuses on climate change, its effects on the marine environment, and how to adapt and response to these changes.

Early life and education 
Melbourne-Thomas completed her undergraduate degree at the University of Tasmania in 2002. She then moved to the UK to the University of Oxford to undertake her Rhodes Scholarship from 2003-2005 working on coral community dynamics. In 2010 she completed her PhD, which developed modelling tools to assist managers in their management of coral reefs, at the University of Tasmania.

Career 
Melbourne-Thomas is a marine ecologist and knowledge broker. Her research focuses on bridging the gap between complex scientific research and decision-making for sustainability, particularly in relation to climate change adaptation. She worked as an ecosystem modeller and science communicator with the Australian Antarctic Division. She was a lead author for the IPCC's Special Report on Oceans and Cryosphere in a Changing Climate in 2019.

Melbourne-Thomas is highly engaged in science communication and the translation of science into decision-making, including through outreach to end-users and policy briefings. She is a co-presenter for the Massive Open Online Course (MOOC) on Open2Study entitled Marine and Antarctic Science. She was named Tasmania's Young Tall Poppy of the Year in 2015 and was one of Science and Technology Australia's first 30 Superstars of STEM.

Melbourne-Thomas was also the co-founder, along with business entrepreneur Fabian Dattner, of the first Homeward Bound voyage, which is an Australian-led, global initiative to foster women's leadership in science. Recognizing the difficulties women in science careers have in obtaining funding, balancing the demands of families and careers, the initiative is privately funded. Her role was to coordinate the science program for the 2016 Homeward Bound program. When challenges prevented the group of 76 global women scientists of varying specialities from sailing out of Australia, Melbourne-Thomas worked to reorganize the launch out of Ushuaia, Argentina. After completion of the research trip, applications were opened for a second voyage and the team was finalized in 2017. They sailed on their second expedition in 2018.

She was one of 12 noted female scientists to be featured as a constellation on the ceiling of the Grand Central Station (New York City) as part of GE's Balance the Equation Initiative.

Melbourne-Thomas is the 2020 Tasmanian Australian of the Year.

Melbourne-Thomas has been published in ICES Journal of Marine Science, Proceedings of the National Academy of Sciences, Nature ecology & evolution, Frontiers in Marine Science, Global Change Biology, Ecology and Society Ecological Applications, Journal of Marine Systems, and PLoS One.

Awards and honors 
 2003-2005: Rhodes Scholarship
 2015: Tasmania's Young Tall Poppy of the Year
 2017: Women's Agenda Leadership Awards (finalist)
 2017: Science and Technology Australia, 30 Superstars of STEM
 2020: Tasmanian Australian of the Year

Selected works and publications

References

External links 
 

Australian Antarctic scientists
Year of birth missing (living people)
Women Antarctic scientists
Australian academics
21st-century Australian women scientists
Living people
Women molecular biologists
Women marine biologists
Australian marine biologists
Australian Rhodes Scholars